The Whales of August is a play written by American playwright David Berry. The play is about two elderly sisters, both widows, who are living together in 1954 in a summer cottage in Maine. The older sister, Elizabeth "Libby" is being taken care of by her younger sister, Sarah. The sisters sit on their porch and watch the whales in the ocean and discuss the trials and tribulations of their lives. The play was adapted as a feature-film in 1987.

Production history
Berry first started writing the play in 1978 through a grant by the National Endowment for the Arts Creative Writing Fellowship, and it premiered in Baltimore at the Center Stage theatre in April 1980, where it was a part of their First Stage series. The play was next staged in 1981 by the Trinity Repertory Company in Providence, Rhode Island.

After receiving good notices, the play was moved to New York City and staged in 1982 at the WPA Theatre, Off-Broadway. The casts for these stagings were all different except for veteran actress Vivienne Shub in the role of Tisha. Shub died in 2014 at the age of 95. The play made its Chicago debut at the Victory Gardens Theater in 1983.

The play is dedicated to David Berry's grandfather, William Finlay Adams (1886–1977). The play is available for licensing by regional theatre groups. In 2014, an all Japanese cast performed the play at the Art Tower Mito.

Historical casting

Adaptations and awards
The play was adapted as a film of the same name and released in 1987. The producer of the film saw the Trinity Rep production, and purchased the rights as a vehicle for Lillian Gish. Berry also wrote the screenplay for the film, which received mixed reviews, with positive recognition for the performances. Ann Sothern was nominated for the Academy Award for Best Supporting Actress.

References

Off-Broadway plays
1980 plays
American plays adapted into films